Seijirō, Seijiro or Seijirou (written: 征二郎 or 晴二郎) is a masculine Japanese given name. Notable people with the name include:

 (1856–1926), Japanese railroad engineer
 (born 1941), Japanese film director

Japanese masculine given names